The kobzari of the Slobozhan bandura tradition were kobzari who lived in the Slobozhan region around the city of Kharkiv, Ukraine. They include Petro Drevchenko, Pavlo Hashchenko, Hnat Honcharenko, Horobetz, F. Hrytsenko-Kholodny, Hryhory Kozhushko, Ivan Kuchuhura Kucherenko, Ivan Netesa, Odnorih, Stepan Pasiuha, Mykola Ryhorenko and P. Trotchenko.

The traditions and playing technique used by the Slobozhan bandurists became the basis for the academic Kharkiv school of bandura playing developed by Hnat Khotkevych.

Ukrainian music people
Kobzarstvo